Graulhet is a commune in the Tarn department in southern France.

It is a centre of tanning. Leather was the main activity before this industry largely relocated to China. Graulhet is crossed by the river Dadou. Graulhet is also one of the last remaining places in the Midi where Mesturets are made traditionally.

Population

See also
Communes of the Tarn department

References

Communes of Tarn (department)